Calcium benzoate refers to the calcium salt of benzoic acid. When used in the food industry as a preservative, its E number is E213 (INS number 213); it is approved for use as a food additive in the EU, USA and Australia and New Zealand.

The formulas and structures of calcium carboxylate derivatives of calcium and related metals are complex. Generally the coordination number is eight and the carboxylates form Ca-O bonds. Another variable is the degree of hydration.

Uses 
It is preferentially used more than other benzoic acid salts or its esters in foods due to its better solubility and safety to humans.

It is used in soft drinks, fruit juice, concentrates, soy milk, soy sauce and vinegar.

It is the most widely used preservative in making bread and other bakery products.

It is used as preservative for water based insecticidal composition which can be sprayed as well as in preparation of calcium formate direct sprayable fertilizers.

It is used as preservative for mouth wash compositions.

It is used in water hardness reducers.

See also
Sodium benzoate
Potassium benzoate

References

Preservatives
Benzoates
Calcium compounds
E-number additives